Lorna Patterson (born October 1, 1956) is a retired American film, stage and television actress and, more recently, a Jewish cantor.  As an actress, her best-known roles were as Randy, the singing stewardess, in Airplane!, and as the lead in the television series Private Benjamin.

Biography
Patterson was born in Whittier, California, where she attended Rio Hondo College for a single semester. Patterson began her professional career while still in high school, performing melodrama at The Bird Cage Theatre at Knott's Berry Farm.

Career
She is a founding member of the Musical Theatre Guild and has appeared in many stage musicals.

She played Randy, the blonde stewardess in the 1980 comedy Airplane!. She co-starred with Tony Randall in the 1981 television pilot Sidney Shorr: A Girl's Best Friend. By the time this became the television series Love, Sidney, she had won the lead role in the 1981–1983 television version of the film Private Benjamin, so her Sidney Shorr role was played in Love, Sidney by Swoosie Kurtz. Earlier, she had been a regular on two short-lived series, Working Stiffs and Goodtime Girls. She also played Liz Drever in 1984, in The Flying Doctors, episodes 2, 3 and 4, in Australia.

Patterson has also lent her voice to some animated productions including the TV series Timeless Tales from Hallmark, the direct to video film Joseph and his Brothers from The Greatest Adventure: Stories from the Bible, the English dub of the Japanese anime film Ultraman: The Adventure Begins and the Christmas special Nick & Noel.

Personal life
Patterson was married to actor Robert Ginty. Patterson worked with Ginty's first wife, Francine Tacker in the 1980 series Goodtime Girls, which also starred Annie Potts and Georgia Engel. She is currently married to actor/director Michael Lembeck, and the couple have two children.

Patterson converted to Judaism a few years after marrying Lembeck (his faith). In 2009 she received her cantorial ordination from the Academy for Jewish Religion in Los Angeles.

Filmography

References

External links
  

1956 births
Actors from Whittier, California
Actresses from California
American film actresses
American Jewish University alumni
American musical theatre actresses
American television actresses
American voice actresses
Converts to Judaism
Hazzans
Jewish American actresses
Living people
21st-century American Jews
21st-century American women